Ördög is a Hungarian-language surname. Ördög is a Hungarian kind of devil.  Notable people with this surname or nickname include:

Zsuzsa Ördög, Hungarian swimmer
, Hungarian TV show presenter
 (1575-1645), Hungarian rebel

See also

References

Hungarian-language surnames
Toponymic surnames